The 1930 Colorado Teachers Bears football team was an American football team that represented the Colorado State Teachers College (later renamed University of Northern Colorado) in the Rocky Mountain Conference (RMC) during the 1930 college football season.  The team was led by third year head coach Bill Saunders and played its home games in Greeley, Colorado. The Bears finished with an overall and conference record of 2–2–3, good for sixth place in the conference.

Schedule

References

Colorado Teachers
Northern Colorado Bears football seasons
Colorado State Teachers Bears football